Catharanthus ovalis is a species of flowering plant in the dogbane family, Apocynaceae. It is endemic to Madagascar.

First published as a species in 1970, several subspecies or varieties have been proposed, however none are now recognized.

References
	

ovalis
Endemic flora of Madagascar